was a  after  and before . This period spanned the years from July 1748 to October 1751.

Change of era
The previous era ended and the new era commenced in  5, on the 12th day of the 7th month.

Events of the  era

 1748 ( 1): The first performance of the eleven-act puppet play  (A copybook of the treasury of loyal retainers), depicting the classic story of samurai revenge, the 1702 vendetta of the Forty-seven rōnin.
 1748 ( 1): Ambassadors from Korea and from the Ryukyu Islands were received at court in Heian-kyō.
 October 7, 1749 ( 2, 26th day of the 8th month): A terrific storm of wind and rain strikes Kyoto; and the keep of Nijō Castle is burnt after it was struck by lightning.

Notes

References
 Hall, John Whitney. (1988). Early Modern Japan (The Cambridge History of Japan, Vol. 4). Cambridge: Cambridge University Press. ;  OCLC 489633115
 Nussbaum, Louis Frédéric and Käthe Roth. (2005). Japan Encyclopedia. Cambridge: Harvard University Press. ; OCLC 48943301
 Ponsonby-Fane, Richard A.B. (1956). Kyoto: the Old Capital, 794-1869. Kyoto: Ponsonby-Fane Memorial.  OCLC 36644
 Screech, Timon. (2006). Secret Memoirs of the Shoguns: Isaac Titsingh and Japan, 1779-1822. London: RoutledgeCurzon. ; OCLC 65177072
 Titsingh, Isaac. (1834). Nihon Odai Ichiran; ou,  Annales des empereurs du Japon.  Paris: Royal Asiatic Society, Oriental Translation Fund of Great Britain and Ireland. OCLC 5850691.

External links 
 National Diet Library, "The Japanese Calendar" -- historical overview plus illustrative images from library's collection

Japanese eras
1740s in Japan
1750s in Japan